Demonoid (also known as Demonoid: Messenger of Death, and Macabra: La mano del diablo), is a 1981 Mexican supernatural horror film written, produced, and directed by Alfredo Zacarías and based on a story by Zacarías. The plot centralizes on a group of explorers, who find a mysterious hand in Mexico that causes madness and death to whoever owns it. The film, an English speaking language Mexican production, was released theatrically in the U.S. in June 1981 to predominantly negative reviews, however, over the years it has achieved cult movie status.

Plot 
300 years ago, in a mine located in Guanajuato, Mexico. A satanic cult built a temple where they sacrificed humans to the Devil by cutting off the left hand of their victims. In the present day, couple Mark and Jennifer Baines explore the temple where they find a small casket containing a severed hand which they take back to their hotel room. Later that night Mark opens the casket and is attacked and possessed by the hand. Fleeing to Las Vegas, he wins a fortune by gambling. Hating being possessed, Mark attempts to sever his left hand but is burned to death by his possessed hand. Mark's body is shipped to Los Angeles for burial. Jennifer arrives at Father Cunningham's church where her husband is to be buried and warns the priest that her husband might still be possessed and requests that an autopsy be performed on the body.

As they talk on the matter, Mark's severely charred corpse reanimates and bursts from his coffin and escapes. When Police Sergeant Leo Matson arrives to investigate the turn of events he is attacked by Mark who then severs his left hand by slamming it in a door, after which Mark falls dead and the hand immediately possesses Matson. Disturbed by his new left hand, Matson arrests Jennifer under false pretences and heads to a plastic surgery office. Matson forces plastic surgeon Dr. Julian Rivkin to sever the hand at gunpoint after which the hand shoots a nurse with Matson's discarded handgun, and murders Matson by brutally ripping the Sergeant's face off. The hand then possesses Rivken who severs his hand on a train track. Later, the hand finds and corners Jennifer at her motel and attempts to possess her as well but is saved by Father Cunningham and they both flee to the church.  Father Cunningham leaves and is asked to administer last writes to a car accident victim who no longer has a left hand. Returning to the church and Jennifer, the two flee the hand which has also made its way to the church. There the hand cuts the power and phone lines and stalks the group, the hand manages to possess Cunningham who then attacks Jennifer with a knife. However he is eventually able to overcome the hand's influence and stabs his own hand and has Jennifer burn his hand off with a blowtorch and scatter the hands ashes in the harbor. Later, Jennifer is back home, but the hand, which somehow survived, attacks and kills her.

Cast 
 Samantha Eggar as Jennifer Baines
 Stuart Whitman as Father Cunningham
 Roy Jenson as Mark Baines
 Lew Saunders as Sergeant Leo Matson
 Narciso Busquets as Dr. Julian Rivkin
 José Chávez as Pepe

Production 

Demonoid was directed by Mexican filmmaker Alfredo Zacarías, who also came up with the film's story. 
Principal photography began in Mexico on October 22, 1979, with a total of four weeks spent on location in various parts of Mexico City and Guanajuato. Other locations were shot in various locations in California before filming officially wrapped on December 19 that same year.

Release 
Demonoid was released theatrically in the United States in June 1981.

Home media 
Demonoid was released on VHS by Media Home Entertainment on July 15, 1988.
It was released for the first time on DVD by Laguna Films on September 28, 2005. It was later released on DVD and Blu-ray combo pack by Vinegar Syndrome on February 23, 2016.

Reception 
Critical reception for Demoniod has been predominantly negative.

Leonard Maltin gave the film 1.5 out of 4 stars, criticizing the script, direction, and special effects as "getting in the way of any suspense". Caitlin Huggins from HorrorNews.net gave the film a negative review, criticizing its plot as 'confusing and hurried', as well as its dumb and unlikable characters. Allmovie gave the film 1.5/5, calling it "inept" and summarized by stating, "Even in its best moments, however, this film can only approximate a particularly weak episode of Fantasy Island".
TV Guide panned the film, awarding it 1.5 out of 5 stars, calling it "awful" and "ridiculous", and criticized the film's acting and plot. Dan Budnik from The Bleeding Skull called it "a rather tedious demon possession movie with a great title and lots of killer hands running around".

However, in reviewing the film over 40 years later, on "The Video Archives Podcast with Quentin Tarantino and Roger Avary," the two filmmakers gave the film a rave review.

See also 
 The Beast with Five Fingers
 The Crawling Hand
 The Hand (1981 film)

References

External links 
 
 
 
 

1981 films
1981 horror films
Mexican supernatural horror films
Body horror films
English-language Mexican films
Films set in Mexico
Films set in Los Angeles County, California
Films shot in California
Films shot in Mexico City
Films about Satanism
1980s supernatural horror films
1980s English-language films
1980s Mexican films